The Two Pigeons (French: Les deux pigeons) is a 1922 French silent film directed by André Hugon and starring Armand Bernard, Germaine Fontanes and Huguette Delacroix.

Cast
 Armand Bernard as Le cousin Planchet 
 Germaine Fontanes as Maud Réville  
 Huguette Delacroix 
 René Maupré as Jean Réville  
 Ernest Maupain 
 Georges Spanover 
 Henry Bender as Henri

References

Bibliography
 Rège, Philippe. Encyclopedia of French Film Directors, Volume 1. Scarecrow Press, 2009.

External links

1922 films
Films directed by André Hugon
French silent feature films
French black-and-white films
1920s French films